The Anderson Valley AVA is an American Viticultural Area centered on the Anderson Valley in Mendocino County, California. It is known primarily for its Pinot noir and sparkling wine production. The valley frequently has long Indian summers. Wineries in the AVA host an annual Alsatian wine festival where locally produced Riesling and Gewurztraminer wines are showcased.

See also
Mendocino County wine

References

American Viticultural Areas
American Viticultural Areas of California
American Viticultural Areas of Mendocino County, California
1983 establishments in California